Herzgewächse (German: "Foliage of the Heart"), Op. 20, is a composition by Austrian composer Arnold Schoenberg scored for coloratura soprano, celesta, harmonium, and harp.  The text is taken from a poem of the same name by Maurice Maeterlinck (title of the French original: "Feuillage du cœur").  The duration of the work is approximately three-and-a-half minutes, making it the shortest of Schoenberg's works with its own opus number.  The work is also notable for the extreme demands made on the singer which at one point has to ascend to a high F (pianissimo), nearly two-and-a-half octaves above middle C.

Composition 

The work was completed on 9 December 1911 and premiered by Marianne Rau-Hoeglauer in Vienna in April 1928 under the direction of Anton Webern.  Herzgewächse is one of Schoenberg's freely atonal works and one in which the music attempts to accurately reflect the meaning of the words.  The voice runs parallel to the words of the poem, as it tries to follow the meaning implied: when the singer sings "sink to rest", she descends to a very low register; however, when she sings "imperceptibly ascending", she progressively rises to one of the highest pitches in the piece.

The harmonium plays the opening chords and plays throughout the piece: the celesta and harp, on the other hand, have numerous rests.

The work was originally written to be featured in Wassily Kandinsky's journal Der blaue Reiter (German: The Blue Rider), as an example of one of Schoenberg's early atonal works.

Notable Recordings 

Robert Craft conducting members of the London Symphony Orchestra, with the voice of Eileen Hulse.

References

External links 

 

1911 compositions
Atonal compositions by Arnold Schoenberg